Finneyville is an unincorporated community in Hardin County, Illinois, United States. Finneyville is near the Ohio River in eastern Hardin County.

References

Unincorporated communities in Hardin County, Illinois
Unincorporated communities in Illinois